Senator Rumsey may refer to:

Catherine Cool Rumsey (fl. 2010s), Rhode Island State Senate
Henry Rumsey (1784–1855), Michigan State Senate